The Wimbledon Cup is a marksmanship trophy that was established in the 1870s.

It is awarded annually during the National Rifle & Pistol Matches which are held at Camp Perry, Ohio and has become the most prestigious prize in US long-range rifle shooting.

Each year the high-power phase of these matches traditionally takes place during the first two weeks of August. The Wimbledon Cup is awarded for the winner of a 1000-yard shooting match — in which the rules permit use of "any sight", including telescopes.

Concurrent with the Wimbledon, service rifle shooters compete for the Farr Trophy, and Palma rifle shooters vie for the "Doc" Aiken Trophy.

History
The Wimbledon Cup is a silver tankard wrought by British silversmiths of the Victorian period.

The British National Rifle Association inaugurated the prize in 1866. The Illustrated London News reported on July 26, 1866, that the Wimbledon Cup was a new prize for the Wimbledon Rifle Meeting of that year.

In 1875, the trophy was presented to the American rifle team attending the British matches at Wimbledon by Princess Louise, on behalf of the riflemen of Great Britain. Members of the American team competed among themselves for the trophy at Wimbledon; this match was won by Major Henry Fulton. The Wimbledon Cup was taken to the United States and placed in annual competition at Creedmoor Rifle Range as the trophy for a long range match open to any rifle. Michelle Gallagher has won the most cups with five. Her family have won it seven times. Her mother Nancy H. Tompkins-Gallagher won once and her step-father Middleton W. Tompkins won once.

The 1965 Trophy was awarded to CPL Carlos N. Hathcock, USMC.

References

Inline citations

Sports trophies and awards
Shooting competitions
 
 
Target shooting trophies and awards